Fudbalski klub Drezga (English: Football Club Drezga) is a Montenegrin football club based in the village of Drezga in Piperi region of Podgorica. They currently compete in the Montenegrin Third League.

History 
FK Drezga was founded on 1972, as a team of Piperi region near Podgorica. At their first seasons, FK Drezga played in the Fourth League - Central region (lowest rank in SFR Yugoslavia). The club was dissolved at the end of the seventies.
During 1999, FK Drezga was reformed. Only two years later, Drezga won the champions title in the Fourth League - Central and gained historical promotion to the Montenegrin Republic League. They spent three consecutive seasons in the Republic League, with seventh place in the 2002-03 season as a best result.
After Montenegrin independence, FK Drezga became a member of the Montenegrin Third League. Two times, FK Drezga was a runner-up of the Central Region Cup (2009, 2011), which gave them an opportunity to participate in the Montenegrin Cup. For the first time in the 2009-10 Montenegrin Cup, FK Drezga made big surprise on first leg, winning on penalties against FK Ibar. They were eliminated in the Round of 16, against First League side OFK Petrovac (0-3; 0-4). In the 2011-12 season, FK Drezga was eliminated in the start of competition by FK Lovćen (1-3).

In the 2018-19 season, Drezga won the title in Third League - Central Region, winning promotion to the Montenegrin Second League.

Honours and achievements
 Montenegrin Third League – 1
winners (1): 2018-19
 Montenegrin Fourth League – 1
winners (1): 2000-01
 Central Region Cup – 0
runner-up (2): 2009, 2011

Players

Current squad

Stadium 
FK Drezga plays their home games at Drezga Stadium. The stadium was built in 1960 and was renovated during 2000.

See also 
 Montenegrin Third League
 Football in Montenegro
 Montenegrin clubs in Yugoslav football competitions (1946–2006)

External links
Fudbalski savez Srednje regije / Football Association of Central Region

References

Association football clubs established in 1972
Football clubs in Podgorica
1972 establishments in Montenegro